Talpiot program is an elite Israeli Defense Forces (IDF) training program for recruits who have demonstrated outstanding academic ability in the sciences and leadership potential. Graduates pursue double higher education while they serve in the army, and they use their expertise to further IDF research and development in technological leadership positions. The program was inaugurated in 1979.

History
The initiators of the program were Professor Felix Dothan and Professor Shaul Yatziv of the Hebrew University, who submitted the idea to the Israeli chief of staff Rafael Eitan. The idea was to harness human creativity, which peaks early, to develop new technologies for the army. The program is sponsored by the Israeli Air Force and IDF Administration for the Development of Weapons and the Technological Industry, and run under the auspices of the Hebrew University of Jerusalem.

Program
During their initiation period, the cadets study for their B.Sc. in physics and mathematics (some of them in computer science – according to their choice) at the Hebrew University in Jerusalem in Air Force uniform, while also undergoing different periods of field training designed to familiarize them with all branches of the IDF (infantry level 04 basic training, combat engineering course, armored corps course, artillery corps course, instruction in military tactics etc.). At the end of the course, which lasts 40 months, the cadets receive the rank of first lieutenant (segen) and a B.Sc. and become integrated in R&D in the IDF and Israel Military Industries, or alternatively, in various combat positions, if they so choose.

In addition to the three years obligated by the Israeli law, the service includes six years of standing army service in a wide variety of positions. The total program, including military service, is nine years.

The first class had 25 cadets. Later, the class was increased to 50–60. The applicant pool consists of nearly ten-thousand top scorers in a test taken by all graduating high school seniors.  150–200 potential applicants are then subjected to a two-day series of tests. These include further IQ exams, as well as group-tasks designed to test one's social dynamics, all conducted under the supervision of trained psychologists and military personnel. For example, teams of applicants are given a specific task then the instructions are changed while the test is in progress, such as shortening the allotted time or changing the assigned tasks. Final acceptance into the program entails a high security clearance rating, given by the Air Force.

In February 2016, the book Israel's Edge: The Story of IDF's Most Elite Unit - Talpiot, written by CNBC executive producer Jason Gewirtz, was published by Gefen in Jerusalem about the unit and the history of how it came into existence.

Notable alumni (Talpionim)
 Uri Alon - professor of systems biology at the Weizmann Institute
 Yoav Freund - professor at the University of California, San Diego, and Gödel Prize winner
 Elon Lindenstrauss - professor of mathematics at the Hebrew University and winner of the 2010 Fields Medal
 Avi Loeb - Israeli-American theoretical physicist at Harvard University
 Marius Nacht - one of the co-founders of Check Point Software Technologies
 Daniel Ramot, Oren Shoval - founders of Via
 Assaf Rappaport, Ami Luttwak and Yinon Costica - co-founders of Wiz

See also

References

Further reading

External links
The beginning of Talpiot

Israel Defense Forces
Military education and training in Israel